Syngnathus carinatus is a species of the pipefish, which is endemic of the northern part of the Gulf of California. It is a marine / freshwater subtropical demersal fish, which grows up to  length.

References

carinatus
Fish of the Gulf of California
Western North American coastal fauna
Endemic fish of Mexico
Fish described in 1892